Beheshtabad (also Romanized as Beheshtābād; also known as Darqīnān, Targhinan, and Torghīnān) is a village in Montazeriyeh Rural District, in the Central District of Tabas County, South Khorasan Province, Iran. At the 2006 census, its population was 538, in 130 families.

References 

Populated places in Tabas County